Wahe Falls, also called Moffett Creek Falls, is an 80-foot waterfall on the Columbia River Gorge, Multnomah County, Oregon, United States. Wahe Falls is the last of several waterfalls along Moffett Creek. The mouth of the Creek is within the limits of the John B. Yeon State Scenic Corridor.

History 
The name of the waterfall is Wahe, although the USGS pinned the name to the next waterfall upstream of Moffett Creek. As a consequence, Wahe Falls has been colloquially known as Moffett Creek Falls. The exact meaning of Mahe is not known. The waterfalls upstream is also called "Upper Mahe".

Access 
While Moffett Creek starts with Gorge Trail #400, a short trail at the west skirt of Munra Point, it does not extend all the way to Wahe Falls. Access to the waterfall continues following the Creek and its side terrains. Several shorter but steep waterfalls precede Wahe Falls downstream, making it moderately difficult to reach. Skilled canyoning is required to proceed past Wahe Falls to upstream waterfalls including Upper Wahe, Apocalypse Falls, and Kwanesum Falls.

See also 
 List of waterfalls in Oregon

Sources

Waterfalls of Oregon
Waterfalls of Multnomah County, Oregon